Cham Konar may refer to:
 Cham Konar, Dezful
 Cham Konar, Hendijan
 Cham Konar, Shushtar